Mahtra War was a peasant insurgency at the Mahtra estate (now in Rapla County, 60 km from Tallinn) in Estonia, in the then Russian Empire in May–July 1858.

The revolt was suppressed using the regular army, 14 peasants were wounded and 7 killed on site, 3 died later of wounds. The military casualties included 13 soldiers wounded and 1 officer killed. 60 of 65 peasant defendants were sentenced to death by a court-martial in Tallinn. Baltic governor-general Suvorov later reduced the sentences of 44 peasants to corporal punishment, 35 of whom were sentenced to exile in Siberia, while the remaining 21 defendants were set free.

Historical context
In the Governorate of Estonia, serfdom was abolished in 1816 (in comparison, in the whole Russian Empire it was abolished in 1861), however the land was not redistributed among the peasants and the corvée labor was preserved (until 1876). The March 19, 1856 manifesto of Tsar Alexander II spoke about further agrarian reforms, but the implementation was slow, and this sparked the unrest, including the Mahtra revolt.

The events significantly influenced the work of the committees working on the project of the emancipation of the serfs in Russia.

In culture
Mahtra Peasant Museum , 
Eduard Vilde, "War in Mahtra",  historical novel (1902, Estonian title: “Mahtra sõda"; Russian translation: Эдуард Вильде, Война в Махтра, 1950, Tallinn, publisher: "Художественная литeратура и искусство")
Anatoli Garshnek, "Mahtra sõda" [Mahtra War] (1958), cantata

References

1850s in Estonia
19th century in the Russian Empire
Rebellions against the Russian Empire
Peasant revolts
Conflicts in 1858
1858 in Europe
19th-century rebellions
Rapla Parish
Kreis Harrien
Military history of Estonia